Brett Stevens edits the blog Amerika.org, a far-right site that describes itself as a "more extreme" version of the neo-Nazi forum Iron March and which helped facilitate the LD50 conference. Stevens inspired and expressed admiration for Anders Breivik, the far-right terrorist who killed 77 in Oslo in 2011.

Amerika.org 

Stevens edits the blog Amerika.org, a far-right site that describes itself as a "more extreme" version of the neo-Nazi forum Iron March. A year after Iron March was shut down, an unknown source leaked user information from the site, including email addresses. Stevens used these emails to reach out to former Iron March users, suggesting that, "If you liked the Iron March forum, you might find Amerika.org to be even more extreme.... We are Nietzschean, pro-Western, and anti-egalitarian. While our approach is more traditionalist than National Socialist, it is uncompromising." The Daily Dot describes Amerika.org as a site promoting the establishment of a caste system, the expulsion of US citizens to their ancestors' countries, the end of global immigration and trade, and support of what the site terms a "new hierarchy" that places a small number of people at the top of society.

LD50
Stevens presented a talk titled 'The Black Pill' at the 2018 LD50 arts conference and helped promote and gatekeep the event on Amerika.org. The title of Stevens' talk references the term used in manosphere and anti-feminist circles inspired from the term in The Matrix. In these contexts, "the red pill" means accepting truth of these ideologies, beyond which Stevens drew a further boundary with "The Black Pill", describing this further pill as rejection of every possibility of 'illusion' and 'positive action' in a manner amounting to total nihilism. Stevens presented alongside Iben Thranholm, VDARE founder Peter Brimelow, Mark Citadel, and neo-reactionary Nick Land.

Views
Stevens supports Zionism, claiming that "the modern age of diversity began with the Jewish diaspora, and the best way to end that is to restore the Jewish people to their ancestral homeland." He has also expressed support for the deportation of Palestinians from Israel, "with reparations."

Stevens opposes anti-Semitism, writing that "The [Jewish-Question] is tempting because it is an excuse for our failure and enables us to avoid taking responsibility for our actions [...] The ugly truth is that the cause of our decay is within us and we can blame no one else."

Unlike some on the alt-right, Stevens affirms the Holocaust.

Stevens says that the alt-right as a whole philosophically descends from deep ecology, and Stevens fuses deep ecology ideology with his white supremacist writings and perspectives. For instance, he translates and merges deep ecology ideas of species extinction and habitat loss into facets of the Great Replacement conspiracy such as white genocide and the replacement of indigenous white people with 'invasive' foreigners.

Influence
Anders Breivik, the neo-Nazi, who murdered 77 in a 2011 terrorist attack in Oslo, described Stevens' writings as inspirational. Following the attack, Stevens described himself as "so honored to be so mentioned by someone who is clearly far braver than I".

Criticism
Claire Goforth, a staff writer at The Daily Dot, has criticized Stevens' writing, referring to it as "long-winded and nonsensical."

References 

Alt-right writers
Living people
Year of birth missing (living people)
20th-century births